Chattanooga is a town in Comanche and Tillman counties in the U.S. state of Oklahoma. It is located on Oklahoma State Highway 36 about 23.7 driving miles southwest of Lawton. The population was 461 at the 2010 census. The Comanche County portion of Chattanooga is included in the Lawton, Oklahoma Metropolitan Statistical Area.

Geography
Chattanooga is located at  (34.423012, −98.655030).

According to the United States Census Bureau, the town has a total area of 0.6 square miles (1.5 km2), all land.

Climate

Demographics

As of the census of 2010, there were 461 people, 179 households, and 128 families residing in the town. There were 206 housing units at an average density of 362.7 per square mile (140.0/km2). The racial makeup of the town was 86.3% White, 0.2% African American, 7.8% Native American, 1.1% from other races, and 3.5% from two or more races. Hispanic or Latino of any race were 5.0% of the population.

There were 179 households, out of which 33.0% had children under the age of 18 living with them, 55.3% were married couples living together, 12.8% had a female householder with no husband present, and 28.5% were non-families. 22.9% of all households were made up of individuals, and 11.2% had someone living alone who was 65 years of age or older. The average household size was 2.58 and the average family size was 3.03.

In the town, the population was spread out, with 26.5% under the age of 18, 7.8% from 18 to 24, 29.2% from 25 to 44, 25.4% from 45 to 64, and 12.6% who were 65 years of age or older. The median age was 38.3 years. For every 100 females, there were 95.3 males. For every 100 females age 18 and over, there were 98.2 males.

According to the 2000 census, the median income for a household in the town was $26,944, and the median income for a family was $38,750. Males had a median income of $24,545 versus $19,821 for females. The per capita income for the town was $12,989. About 7.1% of families and 13.2% of the population were below the poverty line, including 11.6% of those under age 18 and 12.2% of those age 65 or over.

References

External links
 Encyclopedia of Oklahoma History and Culture - Chattanooga

Towns in Comanche County, Oklahoma
Towns in Tillman County, Oklahoma
Towns in Oklahoma